The dhyāngro is a frame drum played by the jhakri (shamans) of Nepal—especially those of the Magars, the Kirati, and the Tamang—as well as by Tibetan Buddhist musicians.

The dhyāngro may be either single- or double-headed. Double-headed drums are said to have a male side and a female side. The drumhead, which is made from animal skin, is struck with a curved beater fashioned from cane. The frame may also be equipped with jingles. Like the na drum of Tibet, but unlike most frame drums, the dhyāngro usually has a handle. The carving in the wooden handle of a dhyāngro may be quite intricate; owing to Buddhist influence, the handles of some drums are fashioned into a kīla.

Ceremonial use

In Nepal, a jhakri (shaman) plays the dhyāngro during traditional shamanic ceremonies.

The drum is occasionally used in Tibetan Buddhist celebrations, as in an orchestra performing Buddhist music. For example: In Malaysia, such a performance greeted the seventh Ling Rinpoche when he visited the Tadika Than Hsiang Farlim and Child Care Centre on Penang Island.

See also

 Navneet Aditya Waiba
Damaru
 Banjhakri and Banjhakrini
 List of Nepali musical instruments
 Music of Nepal

References

Buddhist music
Buddhist ritual implements
Drums of Nepal
Medicine drums